Fingers is a 1941 British drama film directed by Herbert Mason, produced by A.M.Salomon for Warner Bros and starring Clifford Evans, Leonora Corbett and Esmond Knight. Its plot involves a London jeweller and fence for stolen goods who falls in love and tries to reform.

Cast
 Clifford Evans - Fingers 
 Leonora Corbett - Bonita Grant 
 Esmond Knight - Sid Harris 
 Edward Rigby - Sam Bromley 
 Elizabeth Scott - Meg 
 Roland Culver - Hugo Allen 
 Reginald Purdell - Creeper 
 Joss Ambler - Inspector

References

External links

1941 films
British drama films
1941 drama films
1940s English-language films
Films directed by Herbert Mason
Films set in London
Films scored by Jack Beaver
British black-and-white films
1940s British films